John Bland may refer to:
John Bland (martyr) (died 1555), one of the Canterbury Martyrs
Sir John Bland, 4th Baronet (1663–1715), of the Bland baronets
Sir John Bland, 5th Baronet (1691–1743), British politician
Sir John Bland, 6th Baronet (1722–1755), of the Bland baronets
John Bland (dramatist) (died c. 1788), Irish barrister and writer
John Bland (judge) (died c. 1825), judge in Canada
John Otway Percy Bland (1863–1945), British writer
John Bland (architect) (1911–2002), Canadian architect
John Bland (golfer) (born 1945), South African golfer
John Bland (rower) (born 1958), British rower
John Bland (American football) (born c. 1967), American football coach

See also
Bland (surname)
Jack Bland (1899–1968), American musician